Lecithocera sinuosa is a moth in the family Lecithoceridae. It was described by Edward Meyrick in 1910. It is found in Sri Lanka.

The forewings are light glossy grey with a slight purplish tinge and with a narrow rather inwards-curved pale ochreous-yellowish fascia from three-fourths of the costa to the tornus. The hindwings are light grey.

References

Moths described in 1910
sinuosa